Babs is a lost 1920 American silent comedy film directed by Edward H. Griffith and starring Corinne Griffith. Griffith and the Vitagraph Company produced with Vitagraph distributing. The film was also called Bab's Candidate and had the working title Gumshoes 4-B.

Cast
Corinne Griffith as Barbara Marvin
George Fawcett as Senator Merrill Treadwill Marvin
Webster Campbell as David Darrow
Charles S. Abbe as Henry Dawes (credited as Charles Abbe)
William Holden as Ben Cogswell
Roy Applegate as Jabez Prouty
Blanche Davenport as Aunt Celia
Harvey A. Fisher as Shackleton Hobbs
Walter Horton as Eben Sprague
Wes Jenkins as Old Eph
Frances Miller as Mamie (credited as Frances Miller Grant)

References

External links

Lobby card

1920 films
American silent feature films
Lost American films
Films directed by Edward H. Griffith
1920 comedy films
Silent American comedy films
American black-and-white films
1920 lost films
Lost comedy films
1920s American films
1920s English-language films